The Senate is the upper house of the Parliament of the Democratic Republic of the Congo. The senate was established in 1960, abolished in 1967 and re-established in 2003.

During the transition period in the Democratic Republic of the Congo (2003 - 2006), the Senate, aside from its legislative role, also had the task of drafting the country's new constitution. This task came to fruition with the adoption of the draft in Parliament in May 2005, and its approval by the Congolese people, in a successful democratic referendum on 18 and 19 December 2005.

The current President of the Senate is Modeste Bahati Lukwebo, elected in 5 March 2021. The Secretary General is David Byaza Sanda Lutala. The most recent Senate was sworn in on January 28, 2019.

Election 

Senators were elected under the new constitution on 19 January 2007 by the provincial parliaments of their respective provinces.
Members of the Senate are indirectly elected by the Provincial Assemblies. Each of the 25 provinces proper elects four senators and the city-province of Kinshasa elects eight. Elected senators serve five year terms. Former presidents may sit as senators for life.

Transitional Senate

|-
! style="background-color:#E9E9E9;text-align:left;vertical-align:top;" |
! style="background-color:#E9E9E9;text-align:right;" |Seats
|-
| style="text-align:left;" |Movement for the Liberation of Congo (Mouvement pour la Liberation du Congo)
|22
|-
| style="text-align:left;" |Government
|22
|-
| style="text-align:left;" |Political opposition
|22
|-
| style="text-align:left;" |Congolese Rally for Democracy (Rassemblement Congolais pour la Democratie)

|21
|-
| style="text-align:left;" |Civil Society
|21
|-
| style="text-align:left;" |Maï-Maï
|4
|-
| style="text-align:left;" |Congolese Rally for Democracy/Kisangani Liberation Movement (Rassemblement des Congolais pour la Démocratie/ Kisangani Mouvement de Libération)
|3
|-
| style="text-align:left;" |Rally of Congolese for Democracy-National (Rassemblement des Congolais pour la Démocratie – National)
|1
|-
|style="background-color:#E9E9E9"|Total
|width="30" style="text-align:right;background-color:#E9E9E9"|120
|}

List of senators

Sources:

See also
List of presidents of the Senate of the Democratic Republic of the Congo
Parliament of the Democratic Republic of the Congo

References

External links
Senate of the Democratic Republic of the Congo

Government of the Democratic Republic of the Congo
Congo, Democratic Republic of the
1960 establishments in the Republic of the Congo (Léopoldville)
2003 establishments in the Democratic Republic of the Congo